The Cool School is a 2008 American documentary film about the rise of the Los Angeles contemporary art scene. It was directed by Morgan Neville and narrated by Jeff Bridges. The documentary premièred at the Cleveland International Film Festival.

It focused on the Ferus Gallery, and its founders, Walter Hopps and Ed Kienholz. It profiled numerous artists, including Ed Ruscha, Craig Kauffman, Wallace Berman, Ed Moses, John Altoon, and Robert Irwin.

The review aggregator website Rotten Tomatoes surveyed  and, categorizing the reviews as positive or negative, assessed 24 as positive and 2 as negative for a 92 percent rating. Among the reviews, it determined an average rating of 7.00 out of 10. The critics consensus reads "A breezy and lively modern art documentary, revealing that LA is not a cultural wasteland when it comes to fine art."

References

External links

The Cool School at Rotten Tomatoes
The Cool School at Arthouse Films
Article on PBS - Independent Lens

American documentary films
2008 films
2008 documentary films
Documentary films about Los Angeles
Documentary films about the visual arts
Art in Greater Los Angeles
Films directed by Morgan Neville
2000s English-language films
2000s American films